Furcraea tuberosa is a species of flowering plant in the family Asparagaceae, native to the Caribbean. It is naturalized in part of South Africa. Plants have a limited use as a source of fibre.

Description
Furcraea tuberosa is a large perennial plant with succulent leaves. The numerous leaves are arranged in a rosette and range from more-or-less upright to spreading. The flowering stem bears many ovoid bulbils.

Taxonomy
The species was first described, as Agave tuberosa, by Philip Miller in 1768, based on an illustration published in 1696 in Leonard Plukenet's Phytographia. It was transferred to the genus Furcraea by William Townsend Aiton in the second edition of Hortus Kewensis, dated to 1811 (although Aiton wrongly attributed the original name to Carl Ludwig Willdenow).

Distribution
Furcraea tuberosa is native to the Caribbean: Cuba, the Dominican Republic, Haiti, Jamaica, the Leeward Islands, Puerto Rico and the Windward Islands. It has also become naturalized in the Mpumalanga Province of South Africa, where it appears to be invasive via the distribution of bulbils rather than seed, which has not been observed.

Uses
In Haiti, Furcraea tuberosa is used for its fibres, from which hammocks and ropes can be made. The species may have been spread within Cuba in the past by Haitian slaves; it is  particularly found near roads and in small towns.

References

tuberosa
Flora of the Caribbean
Plants described in 1768
Flora without expected TNC conservation status